Beryozovsky District is an administrative district (raion) of Perm Krai, Russia; one of the thirty-three in the krai. Municipally, it is incorporated as Beryozovsky Municipal District. It is located in the southeast of the krai. Its administrative center is the rural locality (a selo) of Beryozovka. Population:  The population of Beryozovka accounts for 40.5% of the district's total population.

History
The district was established on February 27, 1924. It was abolished between January 1, 1932 and January 25, 1935 and then again between February 1, 1963 and January 12, 1965. Since 1938, the district has been a part of Perm Oblast.

Economy
District's economy is based on agriculture. Forestry, timber, and food industry are also present.

Demographics
The most numerous ethnic groups, according to the 2002 Census, include Russians at 81.1% and Tatars at 16.9%.

See also
Vilisovo

References

Notes

Sources

Districts of Perm Krai